Gabriela Míčová (born 25 February 1975) is a Czech actress. She won the Czech Lion award for Best Actress in 2012 for her role in the film Odpad město smrt. At the 2012 Thalia Awards she won the category of Best Actress in a Play.

References

External links

1975 births
Living people
Czech film actresses
Actors from Prostějov
20th-century Czech actresses
21st-century Czech actresses
Czech stage actresses
Czech Lion Awards winners
Recipients of the Thalia Award
Academy of Performing Arts in Prague alumni